Helford may refer to:

People
Bruce Helford (born 1952), American television writer and producer

Places
Helford, Cornwall, village in west Cornwall, England
Helford Passage, village in west Cornwall, England
Helford River, river in Cornwall, England